Army Academy (abbr. MAASK) is a brigade-level unit of the Finnish Army responsible for:
 organising the service-specific and branch-specific parts of studies of Army cadets in Finnish National Defence University
 organising the reserve officer training of the Army in the Reserve Officer School
 guiding the career NCO training of the Army
 organising other training for Army career personnel
 pursuing research and development activities.

Organisation
The Headquarters of the Army Academy are in Lappeenranta. Otherwise, the Army Academy is formed of the following units:
 Training Center
 Armour School, Parola
 Artillery School, Niinisalo
 Engineer School, Lappeenranta
 Infantry School, Lappeenranta
 Signals School, Riihimäki
 Reserve Officer School, Hamina
 Dragoon Band, Lappeenranta
 Army Research Center
 Hamina, most of activity
 Niinisalo, artillery sector
 Riihimäki, signals sector
 Parola, armoured troops sector
 Logistics Centre, Hamina and Lappeenranta)

The Training Centre specialises in the training of the Army career personnel. The Reserve Officer School gives, in addition to the eponymous reserve officer training for conscripts and reservists, normal conscript training for infantry, transport and military police conscripts in three companies, two of which are located in Hamina, with the third in Lappeenranta. The company in Lappeenranta, the Dragoon Troop which specialises in military police training, is also, after the disbanding of Häme Regiment, the last unit bearing the branch colours of cavalry in Finland.

References

Brigades of Finland
Finnish Army
Military academies of Finland